Edmund Boyle, 7th Earl of Cork and 7th Earl of Orrery (21 November 1742 – 30 May 1798) was an Irish peer and Somerset landowner.

Family
A younger son of the 5th Earl of Cork and Margaret Hamilton, he succeeded to his half-brother's titles on 17 January 1764. He died, aged 56 in Marston House and was buried in St John's Church in Frome in Somerset.

On 31 August 1764, he married firstly Anne Courtenay (1742–1785), daughter and eventual heir of Kelland Courtenay (1707–1748). They had six children, including:
 John Richard Boyle, Viscount Dungarven, born 27 May 1765, died 8 March 1768 
 General Edmund Boyle, 8th Earl of Cork, born 21 October 1767, succeeded his father 30 May 1798, died 29 June 1856
 Vice-Admiral Sir Courtenay Boyle, born 3 September 1770, died 21 May 1844
 Lady Lucy Isabella Boyle, married 28 July 1792, died 7 September 1801 the Hon Rev George Bridgeman

The marriage was dissolved in 1782, and on 17 June 1786, he married secondly Mary Monckton, daughter of the 1st Viscount Galway: her salon was one of the centres of intellectual life in London for half a century.

The ODNB considers that Charles Dickens used Maria, Lady Cork as the template for Mrs Leo Hunter in The Pickwick Papers and that 'Benjamin Disraeli, who knew Lady Cork well, is said to have described her accurately as Lady Bellair in his 1837 novel Henrietta Temple'.

Militia career
In November 1774 Cork was commissioned as a captain in the Somerset Militia, and was promoted to major on 1 May 1778, just before the regiment was embodied for fulltime service during the American War of Independence. His company assembled at Bridgwater before the regiment left for home defence duties in the Plymouth defences and at Coxheath Camp in Kent. Cork was promoted to lieutenant-colonel in 1779 and was in active command of the regiment in the summer of 1781 while it was camped on Maker Heights. An inspecting officer found that the regiment had greatly improved under Cork's command. The following year the Somersets were part of 4th Brigade camped at Roborough. The Light Companies of the regiments in the brigade were detached to form a composite Light Battalion at Staddon, which Cork was selected to command. The Militia were disembodied early in 1783 at the conclusion of the war. Cork was promoted to Colonel of the Somerset Militia on 23 November 1784, and retained the position until his death.

Notes

References
 Burke's Peerage, Baronetage and Knightage, 100th Edn, London, 1953.
 W.J.W. Kerr, Records of the 1st Somerset Militia (3rd Bn. Somerset L.I.), Aldershot:Gale & Polden, 1930.

1742 births
1798 deaths
Edmund
Somerset Militia officers
7th
7th
4th